AAAA may refer to:

Internet and computing 
 AAAA protocol, within computer security, "authentication, authorization, accounting and auditing" – the AAA protocol combined with auditing
 AAAA record, also known as "IPv6 address record", maps a hostname to a 128-bit IPv6 address in the Domain Name System (DNS)
 Internet Authentication Service, as an acronym for the four main services provided: Authentication, Authorization, Accounting, and Auditing

Organizations 
 Associated Actors and Artistes of America, an association of the performer trade unions Actors' Equity, AFTRA, Agma, and Agva
 American Association of Advertising Agencies, a U.S. trade association for advertising agencies
 Asociación Argentina Amigos de la Astronomía, an amateur astronomy civil association
 Australian Automotive Aftermarket Association, an automotive industry association for automotive aftermarket parts
 American Association for the Advancement of Atheism, an atheistic and antireligious organization
 Anguilla Amateur Athletic Association, former name of the Anguilla Amateur Athletic Federation, governing body for athletics in Anguilla

Other uses 
 AAAA battery, a 1.5 volt battery, smaller than the AAA size
 AaAa, possible reading of the name Aa, an ancient Egyptian architect
 AAAA, a rhyme scheme

See also
 4A (disambiguation)
 A (disambiguation)
 AA (disambiguation)
 AAA (disambiguation)
 AAAA Tourist attraction
 AaAaAA!!! – A Reckless Disregard for Gravity